Phoberodon is a genus of archaic odontocete cetacean from the Early Miocene (Burdigalian) of Patagonia, Argentina.

Taxonomy and description 
Phoberodon was described in 1926 from a partially complete skeleton lacking the earbones, which was found in the Colhuehuapian Gaiman Formation of Chubut Province, Argentina. Subsequent authors either followed Cabrera (1926) in classifying Phoberodon as a squalodontid, or considered it a relative of Waipatia although the genus was included in any cladistic analysis of archaic odontocetes. However, known specimens lack a periotic, which incorporates most defining synapomorphies of Squalodontidae, and Viglino et al. (2018) recovered Phoberodon as distantly related to Squalodon.

References 

Prehistoric cetacean genera
Prehistoric toothed whales
Miocene genus extinctions
Miocene cetaceans
Miocene mammals of South America
Neogene Argentina
Fossils of Argentina
Gaiman Formation
Fossil taxa described in 1926